The first season of SuperStar, premiered on Rede Globo on Sunday, April 6, 2014 at 11/10 pm (BRT/AMT) during the 2014–15 Brazilian television season.

The winning band is entitled to a R$ 500,000 prize, a brand new Ford Ka and a recording contract with Som Livre.

Rock band Malta won the competition on July 6, beating R&B band Jamz with 74% of the final vote.

Host and experts

Hosts
Fernanda Lima and André Marques were the hosts, while actress Fernanda Paes Leme serves as backstage interviewer.

Experts
Latin Grammy Award–winning singer Ivete Sangalo, singer and actor Fábio Jr. and Capital Inicial frontman and musician Dinho Ouro Preto were the 3 experts for this season.

Selection process
Online applications were open from February 20, 2014 until March 15, 2014. All band members were required to be at least 16 years old to apply.

The auditions
 Key
  – Expert vote "Yes"
  – Expert vote "No"
  – Band joined this expert's team by expert's consensus
  – Band eliminated

Week 1
Aired: April 6, 2014

Week 2
Aired: April 13, 2014

Week 3
Aired: April 20, 2014

Week 4
Aired: April 27, 2014

The duels

Week 5
Aired: May 4, 2014

Week 6
Aired: May 11, 2014

Week 7
Aired: May 18, 2014

The solos

Elimination chart

Week 8
Top 12 Perform
Aired: May 25, 2014

Week 9
Top 10 Perform
Aired: June 1, 2014

Week 10
Top 9 Perform
Aired: June 8, 2014

Week 11
Top 8 Perform
Aired: June 15, 2014

Week 12
Top 7 Perform
Aired: June 22, 2014

Week 13
Top 6 Perform
Aired: June 29, 2014

Week 14
Season Finale
Aired: July 6, 2014

Ratings and reception
The season was panned by the audience and critics. The series premiere was characterized by many technical failures as the SuperStar app did not work for many users, preventing public involvement. Constant error messages appeared on the screen. On Twitter, an avalanche of complaints and jokes about the problem.

There was also plenty of criticism reserved for hosts Fernanda Lima and André Marques, who failed to control the stage, and for the experts Ivete Sangalo, Fábio Jr. and Dinho Ouro Preto, for their lack of objectivity and anxiety in their speeches, sometimes contradictory.

Brazilian ratings
All numbers are in points and provided by IBOPE.

 In 2014, each point represents 65.000 households in São Paulo.

References

External links
SuperStar on GShow.com

Rising Star (franchise)
2014 Brazilian television seasons
2014 Brazilian television series debuts